Vinícius Silva Soares, usually known simply as Tartá (Rio de Janeiro, April 13, 1989) is a Brazilian footballer.

Career statistics

References

External links 

 
 
 

1989 births
Living people
Footballers from Rio de Janeiro (city)
Brazilian footballers
Brazilian expatriate footballers
Fluminense FC players
Club Athletico Paranaense players
Esporte Clube Vitória players
Kashima Antlers players
Criciúma Esporte Clube players
Goiás Esporte Clube players
Joinville Esporte Clube players
Ulsan Hyundai FC players
Campeonato Brasileiro Série A players
Campeonato Brasileiro Série B players
J1 League players
K League 1 players
Expatriate footballers in Japan
Brazilian expatriate sportspeople in Japan
Expatriate footballers in South Korea
Brazilian expatriate sportspeople in South Korea
Brazilian expatriate sportspeople in Thailand
Ubon United F.C. players
Boavista Sport Club players
Association football midfielders